Gimnástico F.C. is a Honduran football club located in Tegucigalpa.  They currently play in the Liga de Ascenso and they play their home games at Estadio Emilio Larach, located in La Kennedy neighborhood.

History
Gimnástico F.C. was founded in 1949.  Although the club have never played in Liga Nacional, they have been around since the amateur era, taking part in the dissolved Francisco Morazán Championship.  In 2017, the team made history as they reached the 2017 Honduran Cup final.

Colours and badge
The club wears a red uniform with blue ornaments.  The badge consist of a red carnation flower and a football.

Stadium
Gimnástico F.C. plays their home matches at Estadio Emilio Larach in Tegucigalpa.  The stadium has a capacity of 3,000 spectators and it has synthetic grass.

Current squad

Achievements
Honduran Cup
Runners-up (1): 2017

References

Football clubs in Honduras
Football clubs in Tegucigalpa
Association football clubs established in 1949
1949 establishments in Honduras